The IPSC Hellenic Tournament Championship is an IPSC level 3 Tournament championship held once a year by the Hellenic Shooting Federation.

Champions 
The following is a list of current and previous champions.

Overall category

See also 
Hellenic Handgun Championship
Hellenic Rifle Championship
Hellenic Shotgun Championship

References 

Match Results  - 2014 IPSC Hellenic Tournament Championship
Match Results  - 2016 IPSC Hellenic Tournament Championship

IPSC shooting competitions
National shooting championships
Greece sport-related lists
Shooting competitions in Greece